Richard Sissons (1819–1893) was a notable New Zealand doctor and Anglican lay reader. He was born in Kingston upon Hull, Yorkshire, England in 1819.

References

1819 births
1893 deaths
New Zealand Anglicans
English emigrants to New Zealand
19th-century New Zealand medical doctors
Anglican lay readers